Fforestganol a Chwm Nofydd is a Site of Special Scientific Interest north of the M4 motorway and east of Tongwynlais, in Cardiff, Wales.

See also
List of Sites of Special Scientific Interest in Mid & South Glamorgan

Sites of Special Scientific Interest in Cardiff